T. Henry Howlett was a member of the Michigan House of Representatives from Gregory, Michigan who was one of six members of the state House killed in the Kerns Hotel fire in Lansing on December 11, 1934.  Also killed were representatives Charles D. Parker, Vern Voorhees, John W. Goodwine, Don E. Sias, and D. Knox Hanna, along with state senator John Leidlein.  The men were in Lansing for a special session of the Michigan legislature.

References

1934 deaths
Members of the Michigan House of Representatives
Accidental deaths in Michigan
Deaths from fire in the United States
Year of birth missing